Antal Vetter was a Hungarian general known for his participation in the Hungarian Revolution of 1848.

References

1803 births
1882 deaths
Hungarian Revolution of 1848
19th-century Hungarian people
Hungarian soldiers
Austrian soldiers